Fousque is an album by Slowblow, released in 1996. The album was originally released in fall 1996 at Sirkafúsk Records and was re-released by Smekkleysa in 2004. The vocals on "7-up Days" were by Emilíana Torrini.

Track listing
"Dusty Couch" - 2:35 
"7-up Days" - 3:48 
"Fever" - 4:05 
"Broken Watch" - 2:26 
"Ghost of Me" - 3:59 
"La Luna E Bianca" - 1:57 
"Sack the Organist" - 2:28 
"Farm Song" - 3:48 
"Surf" - 3:02 
"My Life Underwater" - 5:13

References

1996 albums
Slowblow albums